Galava is a 1932 Tamil language film directed by T.C.Vadivelu Naicker. It was the first Full-length Talkie made entirely in Tamil. The film was based on a play about Arjuna, one of the Pandavas.

cast
P.B.Rangachari
D. R. Muthulakshmi

References

External links

 starmusiq

1932 films
1930s Tamil-language films
Indian black-and-white films
Indian drama films
1932 drama films